Highway 139 (AR 139, Ark. 139, and Hwy. 139) is a designation for two north–south state highways in the Upper Arkansas Delta. One route of  begins at Highway 158 in Caraway and runs north to Missouri Supplemental Route F at the Missouri state line. A second route of  runs from US Highway 412 (US 412) to Missouri Route 51 at the Missouri state line. Both routes are maintained by the Arkansas State Highway and Transportation Department (AHTD).

Route description

Caraway to Missouri

AR 139 begins in Caraway at AR 158. The route runs north to AR 18 in Monette. AR 139 continues north to the Missouri state line to terminate at MO-SSR-F.

Brighton to Missouri
The route lies close to the St. Francis River in low, flat ground dedicated largely to cotton growing where it isn't swampy.

AR 139 begins at US 412 near Brighton. The route then runs north through rural Greene County until meeting and concurring with AR 90 for a brief period east. AR 139 continues north to meet US 62/AR 1 east of Piggott. AR 139 runs with AR 1 through Piggott and with US 62 to Pollard.

After Pollard, AR 139 runs straight north to the Missouri state line, terminating at Route 51 south of Fagus, Missouri.

Major intersections

See also

References

External links

139
Transportation in Craighead County, Arkansas
Transportation in Greene County, Arkansas
Transportation in Clay County, Arkansas